Stranded with a Million Dollars is a survival reality series that premiered on MTV on February 21, 2017, and concluded its run on April 25 of the same year.

Format
Cast members have to survive for 40 days on a deserted island for their share of $1 million. They can purchase the survival supplies and amenities they want, but everything is very expensive and the total is deducted from the final cash prize.

Cast

 Age at the time of filming.

Episodes

International adaptation
A Latin American version titled Resistiré was produced in association with Chile's Mega Media in 2019.

References

External links
 Stranded with a Million Dollars on MTV

2017 American television series debuts
2017 American television series endings
2010s American game shows
2010s American reality television series
American adventure television series
MTV original programming
Television shows filmed in Fiji